The play-offs of the 2022 Billie Jean King Cup Asia/Oceania Zone Group II were the final stages of the Group II zonal competition involving teams from Asia/Oceania. Using the positions determined in their pools, the eighteen teams faced off to determine their placing in the 2022 Billie Jean King Cup Asia/Oceania Zone Group II. The top two teams advanced to Billie Jean King Cup Asia/Oceania Zone Group I.

Promotional play-offs 
The first placed teams of each pool were drawn in head-to-head round. The winners advanced to Group I in 2023.

Hong Kong vs. Thailand

Uzbekistan vs. Mongolia

3rd to 4th play-offs 
The second placed teams of each pool were drawn in head-to-head rounds to find the 3rd placed teams.

Chinese Taipei vs. Pacific Oceania

Sri Lanka vs. Pakistan

5th to 6th play-offs 
The third placed teams of each pool were drawn in head-to-head rounds to find the 5th placed teams.

Vietnam vs. Malaysia

Guam vs. Turkmenistan

7th to 8th play-offs 
The fourth placed teams of each pool were drawn in head-to-head rounds to find the 7th placed teams.

Iran vs. Singapore

Brunei vs. Tajikistan

9th to 10th play-offs 
The fifth placed teams of each pool were drawn in head-to-head rounds to find the 9th placed team.

Laos vs. Maldives

Final placements 

References

External links 
 Billie Jean King Cup website

2022 Billie Jean King Cup Asia/Oceania Zone